Mollie S. Burke is an American politician who serves in the Vermont House of Representatives from the Windham-2-2 district as a member of the Vermont Progressive Party. Prior to her tenure in the state house she was active in local politics in Brattleboro, Vermont.

Early life and education

Mollie S. Burke was raised in Buffalo, New York. She graduated from Marymount Manhattan College with a Bachelor of Arts degree in political science and graduated from Goddard College with a Master of Fine Arts degree. She moved to Vermont in 1970. She married Peter Gould, with whom she had three children.

Career

Local politics

Burke was elected as one of thirteen town meeting representatives from the 3rd district in Brattleboro, Vermont, in 1990. She has served as a town meeting representative since 1990.

Vermont House of Representatives

Elections

Representative Daryl Pillsbury, an independent, did not seek reelection to the Vermont House of Representatives from the Windham-3-2 district in the 2008 election. Burke ran with the Vermont Progressive and Democratic nominations and won in the general election without opposition. Her election made her the second member of the Progressive Party to represent Brattleboro after Representative Sarah Edwards.

She was reelected in the 2010 elections without opposition. She was redistricted into the Windham-2-2 district and won reelection without opposition in the 2012, 2014, 2018, and 2020 elections. She defeated independent candidate Adam Salviani in the 2016 election.

Tenure

Burke supported Peter Shumlin during the 2010 gubernatorial election and called upon members of the Vermont Progressive Party to support Shumlin. During the 2010 election she endorsed Doug Hoffer for Auditor. During the 2016 Democratic presidential primaries she supported Bernie Sanders for the Democratic presidential nomination.

During her tenure in the state house she served on the Transportation committee. In 2017, a recount was conducted in the Orange-1 district and Burke was one of the members of the twenty-three member committee that oversaw the recount.

Political positions

The state house voted 95 to 52, with Burke in favor, in favor of legislation which would allow for same-sex marriage in Vermont and the state house later voted 100 to 49, with Burke in favor, of overturning Governor Jim Douglas' veto of the legislation.

Electoral history

References

21st-century American politicians
21st-century American women politicians
Goddard College alumni
Living people
Democratic Party members of the Vermont House of Representatives
Women state legislators in Vermont
Vermont Progressive Party politicians
Year of birth missing (living people)
Marymount Manhattan College alumni